Thies may refer to

 Thiès, a city in Senegal
Université de Thiès in Senegal
Olympique Thiès, a Senegalese football club
Roman Catholic Diocese of Thiès
Thiès Department
Thiès Region in western Senegal
Thies (name)

See also
Thiers (disambiguation)
Thiess (disambiguation)
Thys
Thijs

Surnames from given names